Virgin Classics was a record label founded in 1988 as part of Richard Branson's Virgin Records.

The unit, along with EMI Classics, was acquired by Universal Music in 2012 as part of the takeover of the EMI Group, however the terms of the European Commission's September 2012 approval of the takeover requires divestment of the classical labels which were sold on 7 February 2013 to Warner Music Group. The European Union approved the deal in May 2013. Warner Music's Warner Classics unit absorbed the Virgin Classics artists roster and catalogue into Erato Records but lost the rights to use either EMI or Virgin names.

Principal artists

 Piotr Anderszewski
 Leif Ove Andsnes
 Nicholas Angelich
 Fabio Biondi
 Gautier Capuçon
 Renaud Capuçon
 Max Emanuel Cencic
 William Christie
 Hughes de Courson
 Alan Curtis (conductor)
 Diana Damrau
 David Daniels
 Natalie Dessay
 Joyce DiDonato
 David Fray
 Vivica Genaux
 Véronique Gens
 Emmanuelle Haïm
 Daniel Harding
 Philippe Jaroussky
 Paavo Järvi
 Truls Mørk
 Roger Norrington
 Artemis Quartet
 Quatuor Ebène
 Christina Pluhar
 Valeriy Sokolov
 Christian Tetzlaff
 Alexandre Tharaud
 Rolando Villazón (early recordings)

References

Classical music record labels
EMI
French record labels
Record labels established in 1988
Record labels disestablished in 2013